Maurice Johnson may refer to:
Maurice Johnson (English politician) (1480–1551), English politician, Member of the Parliament of England for Stamford 1523–c.1539
Maurice Johnson (antiquary) (1688–1755), British antiquary
Maurice Johnson (Canadian politician) (born 1929), Canadian Member of Parliament
Maurice Johnson (American football) (born 1967), American football player
Maurice W. Johnson, English chess player
Maurice Johnson, Jamaican record producer better known as Jack Scorpio

See also
Morris Johnson (born 1937), criminal
Maurice Johnston (disambiguation)